Lisbeth or Lizbeth is a feminine given name, a variant of Elisabeth. It may be:

Notable people 
 Lisbeth Grönfeldt Bergman (born 1948), Swedish politician of the Moderate Party 
 Lisbeth Holand (born 1946), Norwegian politician of the Socialist Left Party
 Lisbeth Klastrup (born 1970), Danish scholar
 Lisbeth Lenton (born 1985), Australian retired competition swimmer
 Lizbeth MacKay (born 1949), American actress
 Lizbeth Marano (born 1950), American artist and photographer
 Lisbeth Movin (1917–2011), Danish actress and director
 Lisbeth Nypan (1610–1670), Norwegian alleged witch
 Lisbeth Cathrine Amalie Rose (1738–1793), Danish actress
 Lisbeth Scott (born 1968), American singer-songwriter
 Lisbeth Stuer-Lauridsen (born 1968), Danish former badminton player
 Lisbeth Zwerger (born 1954), Austrian illustrator of children's books

Fictional characters 
 Lisbeth, character from Sword Art Online
 Lisbeth "Bette" Fischer, title character of Honoré de Balzac's La Cousine Bette
 Lisbeth Salander, fictional heroine from The Girl with the Dragon Tattoo
Empress Lisbeth Brami, ruler of the Otherworld empire Omois who is the paternal aunt of the young imperial spellbinder Tara Duncan, and elder sister of the late Emperor Danviou Brami. Her paternal younger half-brother Sandor is her emperor consort.

See also 
 Elisabeth (disambiguation)

German feminine given names
Scandinavian feminine given names